Acoelodus is an extinct genus of placental mammal, belonging to the order Notoungulata. The genus was first described by Florentino Ameghino in 1897. Its fossilized remains were discovered in Casamayoran terrains from Argentine Patagonia.

References

Notoungulates
Eocene mammals of South America
Paleogene Argentina
Fossils of Argentina
Fossil taxa described in 1897
Taxa named by Florentino Ameghino
Prehistoric placental genera
Golfo San Jorge Basin
Sarmiento Formation